Neochariesthes subsaperdoides is a species of beetle in the family Cerambycidae, and the only species in the genus Neochariesthes. It was described by Stephan von Breuning in 1960.

References

Tragocephalini
Beetles described in 1960